Deh Now is a village in Mazinan Rural District, Central District, Davarzan County, Razavi Khorasan Province, Iran. In 2006, its population was 85, in 25 families.

References 

Populated places in Davarzan County